NityaPurana is a play by Masum Reza. The play is set on Baily Road Mohila Samity Manch, as are Reza's other plays, Birsha Kabbo, Aroj Coritamritya, Shamukbash, Jol Balika (2004), Baghal (2004), Surgaon (2017), Kuhokjal (2014). Most of this play premiered at Baily Road Mohila Samity Manch and Shilpakala Academy.

Productions
On January 14, 2001, the first exhibition of the play was held on the Baily Road Mohila Samity Manch in the Dhaka city. After the 86th stage of 2005, the staging of Nityapurana was postponed. After 12 years later this play again shows 87th stage on November 10, 2017.

Characters
 Ekalabya
 Yudhishthira
 Bhima
 Arjuna
 Nakula
 Sahadeva and
 Draupadi

References

2001 plays
Bangladeshi plays
Bengali-language plays
Bangladeshi drama
Theatre in Bangladesh